Bactra stagnicolana is a moth of the family Tortricidae. It is known from Angola, Comoros, Democratic Republic of Congo, Kenya, Madagascar, Malawi, Mauritius, South Africa South Africa and Zimbabwe.

References

Bactrini
Moths described in 1852